Doña is the female form of Don (honorific).

La Doña may refer to:

Film and TV
 La Doña (2011 TV series), a 2011 Chilean telenovela
 La Doña (2016 TV series), a 2016 American telenovela
 María Félix: La Doña, a 2022 Mexican TV series

Music
 La Doña (album), by Teena Marie

People
 María Félix (1914–2002), Mexican actress